William Henry Dunn (5 February 1841 – 7 July 1891) was an Australian politician who represented the South Australian House of Assembly seat of Onkaparinga from 1875 to 1878.

Family
William Henry Dunn was the son of John Dunn Snr. and brother of John Dunn Jnr. and brother-in-law of William Paltridge, who also were elected to the Parliament of South Australia.

References

Members of the South Australian House of Assembly
1841 births
1891 deaths
19th-century Australian politicians